Caleb Asamoah (born 1 August 2001) is a Ghanaian professional footballer who plays as defender for Ghanaian Premier League side Bechem United F.C.

Career 
Asamoah started his professional career with Bechem United and was promoted to the senior team ahead of the 2020–21 season. On 11 November 2020, he made his debut during the first match of the season after playing 75 minutes in a 1–1 draw against Liberty Professionals.

References

External links 

 
 

Living people
2001 births
Association football defenders
Ghanaian footballers
Bechem United F.C. players
Ghana Premier League players